Damaan Valley is a valley of Dera Ismail Khan District in Khyber-Pakhtunkhwa province of Pakistan. It is situated 55 km from Dera Ismail Khan. Sherani mountain range on its west side and Sulaiman Range in the south-west. Pezu mountains Sheikh Budin range mark its boundary on the north east side. River Indus bounds Damaan from the east and Dera Ghazi Khan District Punjab lies on its south side.

See also
 Kulachi
 Dera Ismail Khan
 Gomal River

References

Dera Ismail Khan District
Valleys of Khyber Pakhtunkhwa